Rathmore Church is a ruined medieval church and National Monument in County Meath, Ireland. It was constructed by the prominent Plunkett living nearby at Rathmore Castle. A modern church 0.5 km to the northeast serving the area was constructed in 1844. Archer and Smith describe it as similar in purpose to other churches constructed at Killeen and Dunsany.

Location

History
Thomas Fitz-Christopher Plunket was a lawyer and judge of the mid-15th century, serving as Lord Chief Justice of Ireland in 1461 and 1463. He was married to Marion Cruise (Mary Anne Cruys) and died in 1471; the couple are buried together at Rathmore, Marion's hereditary family seat.

Lieutenant-General Thomas Bligh (d. 1775) of the 20th Regiment of Foot has a monumental tablet in the church. He fought at Dettingen, Val, Fontneay, and Melle. He was also commander of the British troops at Cherbourg.

The baptismal font was stolen in April 2013 but recovered in May of that year.

Church
Rathmore Church is a nave and chancel church with a three-storey sacristy and a tall bell tower. Features include a piscina, sedilia, carved heads and labyrinth stone. The effigy of Thomas Fitz-Christopher Plunket is in good condition; he wears armour and a dog sleeps at his feet. Marion's is badly damaged.

References

Archaeological sites in County Meath
National Monuments in County Meath
Former churches in the Republic of Ireland
Ruins in Ireland
Churches in County Meath